Sanqiao may refer to:

Sanqiao language, a mixed Dong–Miao language spoken in Liping County and Jinping County, Guizhou, China

Places in China
Sanqiao, Anhui (三桥), town in Huaining County, Anhui
Sanqiao, Daozhen County (三桥), town in Daozhen Gelao and Miao Autonomous County, Guizhou
Sanqiao Township, Henan (三桥乡), township in Runan County, Henan
Sanqiao Township, Hunan (三锹乡), township in Jingzhou Miao and Dong Autonomous County, Hunan
Sanqiao Subdistrict, Guiyang (三桥街道), subdistrict in Yunyan District, Guiyang, Guizhou
Sanqiao Subdistrict, Taiyuan (三桥街道), subdistrict in Xinghualing District, Taiyuan, Shanxi
Sanqiao Subdistrict, Xi'an (三桥街道), subdistrict in Weiyang District, Xi'an, Shaanxi
Sanqiao station